This is a list of circulating fixed exchange rate currencies, with corresponding reference currencies and exchange rates.

List

Notes
1.Approximate.

See also
List of circulating currencies
Fixed exchange rate system

References

Fixed exchange rate